The Football Offences Act 1991 is an act of the UK Parliament signed into law on 27 June 1991. Its creation was intended to curb "disorderly conduct", otherwise known as football hooliganism. It banned the throwing of missiles, indecent and racist chants, and pitch invasions (among other "disorderly conduct").

At the end of the 2021–2022 season, there were several pitch invasions, which led clubs to be more rigorous in seeking prosecutions under the act, which previously had not been stringently enforced. Prosecution will now be considered the "default response."

References

Law of the United Kingdom
Football hooliganism in the United Kingdom
United Kingdom Acts of Parliament 1991